Tipula cava is a species of fly in the family Tipulidae. It is found in the  Palearctic.

References

External links
Images representing Tipula at BOLD

Tipulidae
Insects described in 1913
Diptera of Europe